A Declaration on the Russian World teaching, also known as the Volos declaration is a 2022 theological statement issued by the Volos Academy for Theological Studies and signed by more than 1600 theologians and clerics of the Eastern Orthodox Church in opposition to Russian Orthodox teachings following the 2022 Russian invasion of Ukraine.

The statement, published on the Sunday of Orthodoxy, discusses and condemns as an heresy the ideology promoted by the Moscow Patriarchate since the end of the USSR and particularly since Vladimir Putin's rise to power, that of the "Russian world".

Background
According to most researchers, the concept of the "Russian world" was introduced into modern scientific and political circulation in 1993–1997 by P. G. Shchedrovitsky and E. V. Ostrovsky. This ideology, mixing misguided Orthodox theology, extreme nationalism and a revanchist feeling vis-à-vis the old territories of the Russian Empire and the USSR developed mainly since the accession to power of Vladimir Putin. With the enthronement of Kirill (Gundyayev) as Patriarch of Moscow, the Russian Orthodox Church became a transmission belt for this idea in all sections of Russian society.

This ideology sees a transnational space seeking to justify a fantasized civilizational unity based on references from the Rus' of Kyiv, the unity of the Orthodox religion, the use of the Russian language whose center would be Moscow, perceived as the Third Rome.

Since the end of the USSR, the Russian Orthodox Church has increasingly engaged in initiatives to establish its ecclesiastical authority on what it perceived to be its traditional preserve, while trying to spread its influence over the Orthodox world in general. 

With the 2022 Russian invasion of Ukraine, the situation became increasingly untenable and tense within the Eastern Orthodox Church; about 1600 theologians and clerics, including many Russians, participated in this document condemning the Russian moves within the Church and the "heresies" of the Russian Orthodox Church.

Contents
The document consists of two parts, the first is an introductory note which condemns the "heresy" of the Russian World concept. The second part of the document gives scriptural background and quotes sacred tradition to show that orthodoxy does not accept the "shameful" actions carried out by the Russian government and the Russian Orthodox Church under Patriarch Kirill's leadership.

They link this "heresy" with a certain type of ethno-phyletism.

Signatories
The document was signed by Eastern Orthodox theologians and clerics from Greece, Russia, Georgia, Romania, Ukraine, Bulgaria, France, Czech Republic, US, Lebanon, Germany, Belgium , from Canada, as well as some theologians from India and Serbia. A few hundred signatories are members of the Russian Orthodox Church, or from Russian Orthodox tradition, in particular theologians from Saint Vladimir's Seminary in New York City or the Lossky's in France.

See also
 Religion and the 2022 Russian invasion of Ukraine

References

2022 documents
2022 in Christianity
History of Eastern Orthodoxy
Russian nationalism
Russo-Ukrainian War
2022 in Greece
21st-century Eastern Orthodoxy